John Wood of Keele was an English politician.

Wood was born , the son and heir of John Wood .

Wood served as a JP in Staffordshire 1465–1474, and as MP for Newcastle-under-Lyme 1472–1475.

References

English MPs 1472
English justices of the peace
Members of the Parliament of England for Newcastle-under-Lyme